José Ángel César Delgado (born 3 January 1978 in La Lisa, La Habana) is a retired Cuban athlete who competed mainly in the 100 metres.

Career
He competed for Cuba in the 2000 Summer Olympics held in Sydney, Australia in the 4 x 100 metre relay where he won the bronze medal with his team mates Luis Alberto Pérez-Rionda, Ivan Garcia and Freddy Mayola.

Achievements

References

 
 

1978 births
Living people
Cuban male sprinters
Olympic bronze medalists for Cuba
Athletes (track and field) at the 2000 Summer Olympics
Olympic athletes of Cuba
Athletes (track and field) at the 2003 Pan American Games
Pan American Games bronze medalists for Cuba
Medalists at the 2000 Summer Olympics
Olympic bronze medalists in athletics (track and field)
Pan American Games medalists in athletics (track and field)
Medalists at the 2003 Pan American Games